The Futatsuya-Toshuko Dam is a dam in Fukui Prefecture of Japan, completed in 2005.

References 

Dams in Fukui Prefecture
Dams completed in 2005